Peavy Hall is a building located at 3100 Southwest Jefferson Way on the Oregon State University campus in Corvallis, Oregon, United States.

References

Oregon State University buildings